Events from the year 1929 in Denmark.

Incumbents
 Monarch – Christian X
 Prime minister – Thomas Madsen-Mygdal (until 30 April), Thorvald Stauning

Events

Sports
 14 May  KFUM Roskilde is founded.

Date unknown
 B 93 wins their third Danish football championship by winnin the 1928–29 Danmarksmesterskabsturneringen.

Births
 8 January – Poul Kjærholm, furniture designer (died 1980)
 13 January – Villy Sørensen, philosopher and writer (died 2001)
 3 April – Poul Schlüter, politician (died 2021)
 16 May – Holger Hansen, politician (died 2015)
 28 May – Bent Christensen (director), film director (died 1992)
 25 June – Benny Schmidt, modern pentathlete
 11 July – Anne Wolden-Ræthinge, journalist (died 2016)
 3 October – Erik Bruhn, ballet dancer, choreographer, company director, actor (died 1986)
 7 November – Benny Andersen, poet (died 2018)

Deaths
 3 February – Agner Krarup Erlang, mathematician (born 1878)
 4 March – Peter Kristian Prytz, physicist (born 1851)
 21 March – Otto Liebe, prime minister (born 1860)
 8 April – Evald Tang Kristensen, author and folklore collector (born 1843)
 19 October – Aksel Mikkelsen, educator (born 1849)
 28 December – Kristian Hude, photographer (born 1864)

References

 
Denmark
Years of the 20th century in Denmark
1920s in Denmark
1929 in Europe